Eniola Akinkuotu (born 1986) is a Nigerian journalist and writer. He studied at the University of Lagos.

Career 
Akinkuotu's  journalism career spans across various beats. Between 2011 and 2014, he published mostly stories bordering on crime and human rights violation. He then proceeded to the politics desk where he covered the 2014 Ekiti State gubernatorial election.

Akinkuotu has been a journalist with The Punch newspaper since 2011. In 2016, he was working in tandem with the then government policy against corruption.

One of Akinkuotu's report was listed as runner up in the Judicial Reporting Category at the Judicial Reporting Category at the Diamond Media Award for Media Excellence. He was the winner of the UNICEF Prize for Child-Friendly Reporting at the 2018 DAME Award. In 2020, he was a Runner Up in the Tourism category of the Nigeria Merit award.

See also
 Goodluck Jonathan

References 

University of Lagos alumni
1986 births
Living people
Nigerian journalists
People from Lagos
Residents of Lagos